Jussi Aalto (born 28 July 1983) is a Finnish footballer who represents FC Jazz.

Career

On 21 December 2015, KTP announced that they had signed Aalto for the 2016 season in Ykkönen.

References

External links
 

1983 births
Living people
People from Rauma, Finland
Finnish footballers
Veikkausliiga players
Kakkonen players
Helsingin Jalkapalloklubi players
FF Jaro players
Vaasan Palloseura players
FC Haka players
Seinäjoen Jalkapallokerho players
Klubi 04 players
Kotkan Työväen Palloilijat players
Jakobstads BK players
Kemi City F.C. players
Pallo-Iirot players
FC Jazz players
Association football forwards
Sportspeople from Satakunta